Ondřej Pavelec (born 31 August 1987) is a Czech former professional ice hockey goaltender. Drafted in the second round, 41st overall, by the Atlanta Thrashers in 2005, he stayed with the team as they became the Winnipeg Jets in 2011, and played his final season with the New York Rangers. During the 2012–13 NHL lockout, Pavelec played for Bílí Tygři Liberec of the Czech Extraliga (ELH) and Pelicans of the Finnish SM-liiga.

Playing career

Junior

Pavelec was drafted in the first round of the 2005 CHL Import Draft by the Cape Breton Screaming Eagles of the Quebec Major Junior Hockey League (QMJHL). He was also drafted by the NHL's Atlanta Thrashers in the second round, 41st overall, at the 2005 NHL Entry Draft. He played two seasons with the Screaming Eagles and helped them to a semi-final finish in the 2006–07 season.

Pavelec was a First Team All-Star in each of his two seasons with Cape Breton, and won the Jacques Plante Memorial Trophy for best goals against average (GAA) in both years, making him only the fourth player to repeat as Jacques Plante Trophy winner and the first in 20 years to do so (Robert Desjardins was the last). As a rookie, took home the Raymond Lagacé Trophy and RDS Trophy, awarded to top defensive rookie and rookie of the year, respectively. His numbers were remarkably consistent over the two seasons, as he recorded GAAs of 2.51 in 2005–06 and 2.52 in 2006–07, with save percentages of .929 and .908, respectively.

Professional
Pavelec signed a professional contract with the Atlanta Thrashers in 2007, joining their American Hockey League (AHL) affiliate, the Chicago Wolves. On 18 May 2007, Pavelec shut-out the Toronto Marlies 5–0 in the AHL's Western Conference Finals. Pavelec helped Wolves win the Calder Cup in the 2007–08 season.

After starting nine games for Chicago in the 2008–09 season, Pavelec was recalled to the NHL after Thrashers starter Kari Lehtonen suffered an injury. Pavelec played his first NHL game on 20 October 2007, then made his first NHL start, and recorded his first NHL win, against the Tampa Bay Lightning on 3 November 2007. He was playing with Atlanta since being called up on 1 November 2008, until he was reassigned to the Wolves on 19 December 2008. He later returned to the Thrashers.

On 8 October 2010, Pavelec collapsed and lost consciousness during a game against the Washington Capitals while there was a break in play at 2:25 into the first period. He was taken off the ice on a stretcher and taken to the hospital.  He regained consciousness while at the hospital and was in stable condition, and apparently was concerned about the score in the game, which the Thrashers won 4–2. It was determined after testing by doctors that the cause of his collapse was neurocardiogenic syncope, a type of fainting spell, and that he received a concussion and lost consciousness after his head hit the ice. He was released from the hospital on 11 October 2010. He would return to the ice in a 3-4 shootout loss to the St Louis Blues on 30 October 2010.

Due to the 2012–13 NHL lockout, Pavelec returned to his native Czech Republic, where he was expected to join HC Oceláři Třinec. However, he signed with Bílí Tygři Liberec instead, where he joined fellow NHLer Ladislav Šmíd. During the 2014–15 season, Pavelec set a Winnipeg Jets franchise record by recording three shutouts in a row, going 187:05 without allowing a goal. He was instrumental in helping the team qualify for their first ever Stanley Cup playoffs since the franchise relocated from Atlanta to Winnipeg in 2011.

Pavelec was placed on waivers by the Jets on 10 October 2016 and was subsequently sent down to the Manitoba Moose of the AHL. The Jets recalled Pavelec on 17 January 2017, and he played his first game of the 2016–17 season on 18 January 2017.

On 1 July 2017, having left the Thrashers/Jets as a free agent after ten professional seasons with the franchise, Pavelec signed a one-year, $1.3 million contract with the New York Rangers.

On 20 September 2018, Pavelec announced his retirement after an 11-year career.

International play

Pavelec led the Czech Republic under-17 team to a second-place finish in the 2004 Junior World Cup, and the under-18 squad to a fourth-place finish at the U-18 World Junior Cup. He was also the starting goalie for the Czech Republic junior team at the 2006 World Junior Ice Hockey Championships in Vancouver, Kelowna and Kamloops, British Columbia.

Pavelec then played for the senior Czech team at the
2010 World Championships, helping capture a gold medal. He also competed in the 2010 and 2014 Winter Olympics in Vancouver and Sochi, respectively. In between the two Olympic tournaments, he helped lead the Czechs to a bronze medal at the 2011 World Championships.

Career statistics

Regular season and playoffs

International

Awards and achievements
 Jacques Plante Memorial Trophy (QMJHL's lowest GAA) – 2006, 2007
 Raymond Lagacé Trophy (QMJHL's defensive rookie of the year) – 2006
 RDS Cup (QMJHL's rookie of the year) – 2006
 QMJHL First All-Star Team – 2006, 2007
 QMJHL All-Rookie Team – 2006
 AHL Calder Cup – 2007–2008 Chicago Wolves
 October 2008 AHL Goalie of the Month
 NHL 1st Star of the Week – 22–28 November 2010, 16–22 March 2015
 2011 Georgia's Own Credit Union Three Stars of the Year Award
 Winnipeg Jets 2012 McDiarmid Lumber Three Stars Award

References

External links
 

1987 births
Atlanta Thrashers draft picks
Atlanta Thrashers players
HC Bílí Tygři Liberec players
Cape Breton Screaming Eagles players
Chicago Wolves players
Czech ice hockey goaltenders
Ice hockey players at the 2010 Winter Olympics
Ice hockey players at the 2014 Winter Olympics
Lahti Pelicans players
Living people
Manitoba Moose players
New York Rangers players
Olympic ice hockey players of the Czech Republic
Sportspeople from Kladno
Winnipeg Jets players
Czech expatriate ice hockey players in the United States
Czech expatriate ice hockey players in Canada